The 2014 Southern Oregon Raiders football team was an American football team that represented Southern Oregon University as a member of the Frontier Conference during the 2014 NAIA football season. In their fourth season under head coach Craig Howard, the Raiders compiled a 13–2 record (8–2 against conference opponents) and won the NAIA national championship, defeating , 55–31, in the NAIA National Championship Game.

The team's statistical leaders included receiver Dylan Young who led the NAIA with 1,631 receiving yards.

The team played its home games at Phillips Field (Ashland High School) and at Raider Stadium, both in Ashland, Oregon.

Schedule

References

Southern Oregon
Southern Oregon Raiders football seasons
NAIA Football National Champions
Southern Oregon Raiders football